Prohibition in the Russian Empire and the Soviet Union existed during 1914–25. The Russian term is "сухой закон" (sukhoy zakon, literally "dry law").

Russian Empire 
Prohibition as introduced in the Russian Empire in 1914 permitted the sale of hard liquor only in restaurants. It was introduced at the beginning of World War I with a belief that it would prevent the army from dealing with drunken soldiers. Other warring countries (e.g. the United Kingdom, France, and Germany) imposed certain restrictions on alcoholic drinks, but only Russia completely stopped the retail sale of vodka.

Soviet Russia and the Soviet Union
Prohibition continued through the turmoil of the Russian Revolution of 1917 and the Russian Civil War, into the period of Soviet Russia and the Soviet Union until 1925.

In the Soviet Union, there were three major anti-alcohol campaigns: started in 1958, 1972, and 1985.

Gorbachev's anti-alcohol campaign 

During 1985–1987, Mikhail Gorbachev carried out an anti-alcohol campaign with partial prohibition, colloquially known as the "dry law". Prices of vodka, wine and beer were raised, and their sales were restricted in amount and time of day. People who were caught drunk at work or in public were prosecuted.

The reform had an effect on alcoholism in the country, as evident from statistics showing some fall in criminality and rise in life expectancy, but economically it was a serious blow to the state budget (a loss of approximately 100 billion rubles to the exchequer according to Alexander Yakovlev) after alcohol production migrated to the black market economy.

See also
 Alcohol consumption in Russia
 Drug policy of the Soviet Union

References

External links 
 The Museum of Anti-Alcohol Posters

Russia
Society of the Soviet Union
Alcohol in Russia
Alcohol law by country
Law in the Russian Empire
Perestroika
Soviet law